James Heathcote (17 January 1894 – after 1928) was an English footballer who scored 83 goals from 197 appearances in the Football League playing for Blackpool, Notts County, Lincoln City and Coventry City. He played as a centre forward or inside forward. He was on the books of Bolton Wanderers and Accrington Stanley without representing either club in the league, and also played in the Southern League for Pontypridd and in the Midland League for Mansfield Town.

References

1894 births
Year of death missing
Footballers from Bolton
English footballers
Association football forwards
Bolton Wanderers F.C. players
Blackpool F.C. players
Notts County F.C. players
Pontypridd F.C. players
Lincoln City F.C. players
Mansfield Town F.C. players
Coventry City F.C. players
Accrington Stanley F.C. (1891) players
English Football League players
Southern Football League players
Midland Football League players
Place of death missing